The Korana is a river in central Croatia and west Bosnia and Herzegovina.

The river's name is derived from Proto-Indo-European *karr- 'rock'. It was recorded in the 13th century as Coranna and Corona.

Korana rises in the eastern parts of Lika and creates the Plitvice Lakes, a UNESCO World Heritage Site. Downstream from Plitvice Lakes, the Korana river forms a 25 kilometers long border between Croatia and Bosnia and Herzegovina near Cazin. From there it flows northwards through Croatia, where it finally reaches the river Kupa at Karlovac.

The soil of the karst region, through which this river flows consists of limestone.
Under certain physical and chemical conditions the river is constantly creating new soil from plants (see: Plitvice Lakes).

The river Slunjčica flows into Korana at Rastoke/Slunj, and the river Mrežnica flows into it at Karlovac.

In the Korana exist rich molluscan assemblages composed of 33 species.

See also 
 Plitvice Lakes
 Una

References

Sources

 
 Karlovac: četiri rijeke - jedan grad 

Rivers of Croatia
Rivers of Bosnia and Herzegovina
International rivers of Europe
Landforms of Karlovac County
Bosnia and Herzegovina–Croatia border
Border rivers